Nikolay Alexandrovich Dobrolyubov (5 February [O.S. 24 January] 1836 – 29 November [O.S. 17 November] 1861) was a Russian poet, literary critic, journalist, and prominent figure of the Russian revolutionary movement. He was a literary hero to both Karl Marx and Lenin.

Life
Dobrolyubov was born in Nizhny Novgorod where his father was a poor priest. 

He was educated at a clerical primary school, then at a seminary from 1848 to 1853. He was considered a prodigy by his teachers in the seminary, and at home he spent most of his time in his father's library, reading books on science and art. By the age of thirteen, he was writing poetry and translating verses from Roman poets such as Horace. In 1853 he went to Saint Petersburg and entered the University. Following the deaths of both of his parents, in 1854, he assumed responsibility for his brothers and sisters. He worked as a tutor and translator in order to support his family and continue his studies. His heavy workload and the stress of his position had a negative effect on his health.

During his years at the University, he organized an underground democratic circle, issued a manuscript newspaper, and led the student's struggle against the reactionary University administration. His poems On the 50th Birthday of N. I. Grech (1854), and Ode on the Death of Nicholas I (1855), copies of which were distributed outside the University, showed his hostile attitude toward the autocracy.

In 1856 he met the influential critic Nikolay Chernyshevsky, and the publisher Nikolay Nekrasov. He soon began publishing his works in Nekrasov's popular journal Sovremennik. In 1857, after his graduation from the University, he joined the staff of Sovremennik as head of the critical department. Over the next four years, he produced several volumes of important critical essays. One of his best-known works was his essay What is Oblomovism?, based on his analysis of the novel Oblomov by Ivan Goncharov.

In May 1860, at the insistence of friends, he went abroad in an effort to treat incipient tuberculosis, which had been exacerbated by overwork. He lived in Germany, Switzerland, France, and for more than six months in Italy, where the national liberation movement, led by Giuseppe Garibaldi, was taking place. The situation in Italy provided him with material for a series of articles.

He returned to Russia in July 1861. He died in November 1861, at the age of twenty-five, from acute tuberculosis. He was buried next to Vissarion Belinsky at Volkovo Cemetery in Saint Petersburg.

English translations

What is Oblomovism?, from Anthology of Russian Literature, Part 2, Page 272, Leo Weiner, G.P. Putnam's Sons, NY, 1903. from Archive.org
Selected Philosophical Essays, Foreign Languages Publishing House, Moscow, 1956.
Belinsky, Chernyshevsky & Dobrolyubov: Selected Criticism, Indiana University Press, Bloomington, 1976.

References

External links
A poem by Dobrolyubov- Death's Jest
Dobrolyubov Memorial Museum

1836 births
1861 deaths
19th-century deaths from tuberculosis
19th-century journalists from the Russian Empire
19th-century poets
19th-century male writers from the Russian Empire
Literary critics from the Russian Empire
Male writers from the Russian Empire
People from Nizhegorodsky Uyezd
Writers from Nizhny Novgorod
Russian male poets
Russian nihilists
Russian non-fiction writers
Russian male journalists
Tuberculosis deaths in Russia